Fiddlers Three is a 1944 British black-and-white musical comedy. It includes a number of musical sections, mainly focussing on replacing the word "home" with "Rome". The film was produced by Michael Balcon and directed by Harry Watt.  The cast included Tommy Trinder, Sonnie Hale, Frances Day, Francis L. Sullivan, Diana Decker and Elisabeth Welch. Making their film debuts were James Robertson Justice, and Kay Kendall near the bottom of the cast list, as the "Girl Who Asks About Her Future At Orgy". The film follows the adventures of two sailors and a Wren who are struck by lightning and transported back to Ancient Rome, where they are accepted as seers.

The title comes from the nursery rhyme "Old King Cole".

The film was called While Nero Fiddled on its USA release. It is a loose sequel to the 1940 film Sailors Three which had also starred Trinder. The film was only moderately successful at the British Box Office but proved to be a major hit in Australia.

Plot
Tommy Taylor and "The Professor", two sailors returning from leave to Portsmouth on a tandem bicycle, they sing Sweet Fanny Adams - a song which now sounds very innocent but was extremely risque at the time.

They rescue  Lydia, a Wren, who had been hitch-hiking on the road and was assaulted by an over-amorous driver. They get a puncture as they reach Stonehenge. The professor tells them of an old legend that those caught at Stonehenge at midnight on midsummer's night are transported back in time. Moments later the area is struck by lightning. Nearby a group of Roman soldiers have suddenly appeared whom they initially mistake for members of ENSA. However, they swiftly prove to be genuine Romans who arrest them and threaten instant death unless they can prove they are Druids.

Among the musical numbers in the picture, Tommy Trinder gives a stupendous performance as "Senorita Alvarez" from Brazil (impersonating Carmen Miranda). Caesar creates him a Dame of the Roman Empire for his performance.

Cast
 
 Tommy Trinder as Tommy Taylor
 Frances Day as Poppaea
 Sonnie Hale as 'The Professor' 
 Francis L. Sullivan as Nero 
 Elisabeth Welch as Thora 
 Mary Clare as Volumnia 
 Diana Decker as Lydia
 Ernest Milton as Titus 
 James Robertson Justice as Centurion of the 8th Legion
 Russell Thorndike as High Priest 	
 Frederick Piper as Auctioneer
 Alec Mango as Secretary 
 Danny Green as Lictor 
 Frank Tickle as Master of Ceremonies
 Kay Kendall as slave girl who asks about her future at orgy
 Robert Wyndham as Lion-Keeper

Critical reception
Sky Movies said, "the stars look as though they're having fun, which was just the tonic for wartime audiences, though it all looks less than sparkling now."
George Perry wrote in Forever Ealing, "the film is not of great consequence. The script ... Was thick with laboured gags likening aspects of Roman times to wartime Britain."
Graeme Clark wrote in The Spinning Image, "played with a mixture of cheeky charm and a sly wink from the cast, and notable for its casting of black singer and actress Elisabeth Welch in a refeshingly non-stereotypical role for its day, if you catch the references then you should have fun with Fiddlers Three. Yes, it's nonsense, but it's nonsense well done."
Time Out called the film a "cheeky wartime British comedy with odd imaginative touch (associate producer Robert Hamer reshot a good deal of it)."

Bibliography
 Reid, John. Films Famous, Fanciful, Frolicsome and Fantastic. Lulu, 2006.

References

External links
 

1940s historical comedy films
British black-and-white films
Ealing Studios films
1944 films
Films directed by Harry Watt
Films set in the 1940s
Depictions of Nero on film
Films about time travel
Films produced by Michael Balcon
Films set in England
Films set in ancient Rome
British historical comedy films
1940s English-language films
1940s British films